Computational Geometry, also known as Computational Geometry: Theory and Applications, is a peer-reviewed mathematics journal  for research in theoretical and applied computational geometry, its applications, techniques, and design and analysis of geometric algorithms. All aspects of computational geometry are covered, including the numerical, graph theoretical and combinatorial aspects, as well as  fundamental problems in various areas of application of computational geometry: in computer graphics, pattern recognition, image processing, robotics, electronic design automation, CAD/CAM, and geographical information systems.

The journal was founded in 1991 by Jörg-Rüdiger Sack and Jorge Urrutia.
It is indexed by Mathematical Reviews, Zentralblatt MATH, Science Citation Index, and Current Contents/Engineering, Computing and Technology.

References

External links

Mathematics journals
English-language journals
Quarterly journals
Computational geometry
Elsevier academic journals